Die Haghe can refer to: 
 KV Die Haghe, a korfball club from The Hague
 SV Die Haghe, a football club from The Hague
 An old name for The Hague